The Way Steel Was Tempered is a 1988 Yugoslav film directed by Serbian director Želimir Žilnik. It was nominated for a Golden St. George award at the 16th Moscow International Film Festival and has been screened at festivals worldwide such as the Toronto International Film Festival. It was also shown at the Pyongyang Film Festival.

Plot
A steel worker, Leo, tries to live a carefree life, but his progress towards that goal is impeded by the steel mill management that does its best to earn a profit before the steel bubble bursts and the company goes under. Leo and his comrades are faced with a bleak and uncertain future. As this trouble with his employment goes on, he meets a woman named Verica and becomes involved in an extramarital affair with her.

His wife, Ruža, fed up with her husband's constant cheating and dishonesty divorces him and goes back to live with her parents, leaving Leo behind. As she takes her leave, she meets Michel, the head of security at Leo's steel mill. Michel is a photographer and an ex-soldier. After seeing them together, Leo is faced with emotional turmoil and manages to lose his job after a jealous outburst. In a fit of anger Leo attempts to knock down a monument in the town square, and is sent to prison.

Oddly enough, after being sent to prison Leo ends up working back at the steel mill, as the factory and the prison have a deal in using prisoners as general laborers. Foreign business partners arrive and they are very impressed with the historic appearance of the mill and the workers that they decide that the whole place be put under historic preservation. The foreign partners, being passionate collectors of socialist realism take a liking to Leo and take him with them as a "perfect specimen." Several years later he returns - triumphantly - driving a new Cadillac car.

Cast
 Lazar Ristovski as Leo
 Tatjana Pujin as Lili
 Relja Bašić as Michel
 Ljiljana Blagojević as Ruža

References

External links
 
 Home Page
 Movie Info on Balkan Media

1988 films
Serbo-Croatian-language films
1980s Serbian-language films
Films directed by Želimir Žilnik
Serbian drama films
Yugoslav drama films
Films set in Novi Sad
1988 drama films
Films shot in Serbia